Signaling Gateway is a web portal dedicated to signaling pathways powered by the San Diego Supercomputer Center at the University of California, San Diego. It was initiated by a collaboration between the Alliance for Cellular Signaling and Nature. A primary feature is the Molecule Pages database.

Molecule Pages Database (online database journal) 

Signaling Gateway Molecule Pages is a database containing "essential information on more than 8000 mammalian proteins (Mouse and Human) involved in cellular signaling."

The content of molecule pages is authored by invited experts and is peer-reviewed. The published pages are citable by digital object identifiers (DOIs). All data in the Molecule Pages are freely available to the public.

Data can be exported to PDF, XML, BioPAX/SBPAX and SBML.

MIRIAM Registry Details.

Some Published Molecule Pages

References

External links 
 Signaling Gateway Molecule Pages

Cell biology
Cell signaling
Neurochemistry
Signal transduction
Biological databases